Bertram Lloyd Marshall ORTT (6 February 1936 – 17 October 2012), known as Bertie Marshall, was a pioneer, musician and music instrument maker of the steelpan.

Career
Marshall was born in 1936, in Port-of-Spain, Trinidad and Tobago. As a child, he roamed the streets of John John and Success Village, Laventille. As a boy, he watched pioneering tuners at work and came into contact with Winston "Spree" Simon who created the multiple notes on the convex metal containers used for making pans. These encounters sparked his interest in the steelpan and began his secret association with pan and panmen. 

Marshall began playing openly after his mother died in 1954, but had tuned his first pan long before that. At the age of 14, he got an old ping pong from Tokyo Steelband and tried to retune it, using his harmonica. By 18, he began tuning pans, guided by other tuners such as Carl Greenidge. Marshall was dissatisfied with what he called ping pong's inferior tone.

By 1956, Bertie Marshall had accomplished the most significant development in today’s steelpan tone, revolutionizing the method of tuning, by changing the instrument from the inharmonic style. By tuning the notes by octaves and introducing complex tuning techniques he produced harmonics, giving the steelpan its complex sound. By discovering and establishing this harmonic tuning method he is singularly responsible for the sound of today's frontline steelband instruments, brightening the overall sound in the process.

Marshall is also credited with inventing the Double Tenor instrument and for being the first person to amplify the steelpan. He developed the Quadrophonics, Six Pan and Twelve Bass, together with Rudolph Charles of Desperadoes Steel Orchestra from Laventille. Marshall had been building and tuning instruments for Desperadoes since 1970.

Marshall was part of a project of the Caribbean Industrial Research Institute in 1982, which investigated the possibilities of machine production of steelpans. Because of Marshall’s contributions to Trinidad & Tobago’s National Instrument, the T&T government awarded him their Chaconia Gold Medal, given for "Outstanding Service to the Country". That was the first time the award was given in the field of music. He further received the Order of the Republic of Trinidad and Tobago, presented by President George Maxwell Richards in 2008.

Death
Bertie Marshall died at the age of 76 on 17 October 2012, with his children at his bedside. He left behind three children, Claude, Claudine and Leanora "Jill" and eight grandchildren.

Readings
Felix I. R. Blake: The Trinidad and Tobago Steel Pan: History and Evolution.

Notes

References
 "Materials science and metallurgy of the Caribbean steel drum Part I Fabrication, deformation phenomena and acoustic fundamentals", Springer Netherlands, 
 Jeannine Remy D.M.A. and Jeremy G. de Barry, "Reflection on Aspects that define the Steelband culture of Trinidad and Tobago",  June 2005

External links
 "Bertie Marshall Speaks on the Steelpan" (interview recorded 13 March 2005), trinbagopan.com, 18 March 2005.
 Belgrave, Ian "Teddy", "Bertie Marshall - Pan Scientist", trinbagopan.com, 10 September 2008.

Steelpan musicians
Trinidad and Tobago musicians
Recipients of the Order of the Republic of Trinidad and Tobago
2012 deaths
1936 births
People from Port of Spain